This is a list of films which placed number-one at the Weekly box office in Hong Kong during 2022.

Highest-grossing films

See also
 2022 in Hong Kong
 List of Hong Kong films of 2022
 List of 2021 box office number-one films in Hong Kong

References

External links
 Weekly Box Office | Hong Kong International Film & TV Market (FILMART) 2022
 2022 Hong Kong Box Office Revenue: Weekly Index Table in 

Hong Kong
2022 in Hong Kong
2022
Hong Kong film-related lists